Giuseppe Anatrelli (3 January 1925 – 29 November 1981), also known as Geppino Anatrelli, was an Italian film, stage and television actor.

Born in Naples, he was part of the Eduardo De Filippo theatrical company between 1953 and 1959. Later he starred again with De Filippo in the 1963 television series Peppino Girella, and rejoined his company in the early 1970s.

His film works span different genres, but he's probably best known for his portrait of "Geometra Luciano Calboni" in the first three chapters of the Fantozzi film series.

Selected filmography 
 In Prison Awaiting Trial (1971)
 Sgarro alla camorra (1973)
 Piedino il questurino (1974)
 Fantozzi (1975)
 The Sunday Woman (1975)
 Il marsigliese (1975)
 Il secondo tragico Fantozzi (1976)
 Scandalo in famiglia (1976)
 Sex Diary (1976)
 Double Murder  (1977)
 Three Tigers Against Three Tigers (1977)
 Fantozzi contro tutti (1980)

References

External links 
 
 Massimo Colella, Profilo biografico di attori partenopei del XX secolo: VII. Giuseppe Anatrelli, 2022 (https://www.centrostuditeatro.it/2022/03/giuseppe-anatrelli/).

Italian male film actors
1925 births
Italian male television actors
1981 deaths
Male actors from Naples
Italian male stage actors
20th-century Italian male actors